The Ministry of Finance of Chile is the cabinet-level administrative office in charge of managing the financial affairs, fiscal policy, and capital markets of Chile; planning, directing, coordinating, executing, controlling and informing all financial policies formulated by the President of Chile.

Since March 2022, the Minister of Finance is Mario Marcel.

History

In 1814 the Secretary of Finance was created, as Supreme Director Bernardo O'Higgins sought to develop an administrative framework for the then newly formed nation, considering the need to ascertain its independence from the Spanish crown. The office was first organized by a Presidential Decree on 2 June 1817, and was named "Secretariat of Finance" (1818 - 1824). Hipólito de Villegas was appointed to lead the new institution. The present structure, duties and attributions were defined by Presidential Decree N° 7912, "General Law of Ministries", on 30 November 1927.

Institutional framework

According to Article 6 of Decree 7,912 of 1927, the Ministry of Finance responsibilities include, among other:
 Management of State's financial policy
 Collection and administration of public revenue
 Public accounting
 Study of custom policy and intervention in trade agreements
 Issues concerning monetary laws, banks and credit institutions
 Issues concerning corporation oversight, stock exchange and insurance
 Everything related to public credit and the presentation in Congress of projects affecting public finance
 The development and technical study of the Budget of the Nation and investment account

In practice, the Ministry of Finance executes policies through several related and dependent institutions.

Related Institutions:
BancoEstado
 Government Procurement Directorate
 Civil Service Directorate
 National Customs Service
 Internal Tax Service
 Public Purchasing and Recruiting Department
 Superintendency of Banks and Financial Institutions
 Superintendency of Securities and Insurance
 Superintendency of Game Casinos
 Financial Analysis Unit

Dependent Institutions:
 Budget Office
 General Treasury of the Republic

Policies

One of Chile's fiscal policy central features has been its counter-cyclical nature. This has been facilitated by the voluntary application since 2001 of a structural balance policy based on the commitment to an announced goal of a medium-term structural balance as a percentage of GDP.  The structural balance nets out the effect of the economic cycle (including copper price volatility) on fiscal revenues and constrains expenditures to a correspondingly consistent level. In practice, this means that expenditures rise when economic activity is low and decrease in booms. The target was of 1% of GDP between 2001 and 2007, it was reduced to 0.5% in 2008 and then to 0% in 2009 in the wake of the global financial crisis In 2005, key elements of this voluntary policy were incorporated into legislation through the Fiscal Responsibility Law (Law 20,128).

However, the financial crisis of 2008 together with the reconstruction following the 2010 Chile earthquake undermined the financial position of the country, resulting in a structural deficit that was reduced to 1/2 percent of GDP in 2012, two years ahead of government expectations to pass the 1% threshold. The 2013 budget was devised with a target structural deficit of 1%.

The Fiscal Responsibility Law also allowed for the creation of two sovereign wealth funds: the Pension Reserve Fund (PRF) and the Economic and Social Stabilization Fund (ESSF). The PRF was created as a response to the expected increase in liabilities related to old-age pensions and benefits, especially for the poor, and it had accumulated US$5.883 million (market value) by the end of 2012. The PRF is set to receive yearly capital injections between 0.2% and 0.5% of the previous year's GDP depending on the fiscal surplus, so new resources are secured every year. The ESSF's objective is to stabilize fiscal spending by providing funds to finance fiscal deficits and debt amortization and had market value of US$14.998 million by the end of year 2012. Each year, the ESSF accumulates any fiscal surplus remaining after the contributions to the FRP and to the capital of the Central Bank of Chile, excluding debt service and anticipatory  contributions during the previous year. The funds are managed by the Central Bank of Chile and a Financial Committee advises on their investment policy. Chile also participated in the discussion and agreed to the Santiago Principles.

The main taxes in Chile in terms of revenue collection are the value added tax (45.8% of total revenues in 2012) and the income tax (41.8% of total revenues in 2012). The value added tax is levied on sales of goods and services (including imports) at a rate of 19%, with a few exemptions. The income tax revenue comprises different taxes. While there is a corporate income tax of 20% over profits from companies (called First Category Tax), the system is ultimately designed to tax individuals. Therefore, corporate income taxes paid constitute a credit towards two personal income taxes: the Global Complementary Tax (in the case of residents) or the Additional Tax (in the case of non-residents). The Global Complementary Tax is payable by those that have different sources of income, while those receiving income solely from dependent work are subject to the Second Category Tax. Both taxes are equally progressive in statutory terms, with a top marginal rate of 40%. Income arising from corporate activity under the Global Complementary Tax only becomes payable when effectively distributed to the individual. There are also special sales taxes on alcohol and luxury goods, as well as specific taxes on tobacco and fuel. Other taxes include the inheritance tax and custom duties.

In 2012, general government expenditure reached 21.5% of GDP, while revenues were equivalent to 22% of GDP. Gross financial debt amounted to 12.2% of GDP, while in net terms it was of -6.9% of GDP, both well below OECD averages.

Chile's prudent fiscal policy along with low debt levels have been cited as contributing factors to Chile's exceptionally high credit rating in the context of the region.  Chile's AA- S&P rating is the highest in the Latin America, while Fitch Ratings places the country one step below, in A+.

List of Ministers of Finance

Patria Vieja period

Ministers of Finance

PAL - Partido Agrario Laborista
PC - Partido Conservador
PCCh - Partido Comunista de Chile
PCSC - Partido Conservador Social Cristiano
PCU - Partido Conservador Unido
PDC - Partido Democrata Cristiano
Ind - Independiente
PL - Partido Liberal
PLD - Partido Liberal Democrático
MAPU - Movimiento de Acción Popular Unitaria
PN - Partido Nacional
PNa - Partido Unión Nacionalista
PR - Partido Radical
PRDe - Partido Radical Democrático
PS - Partido Socialista

Sources

References

External links
[ 

Finance
Finance in Chile
Chile
Chile, Finance
1817 establishments in the Captaincy General of Chile